is a Japanese footballer who plays as a forward for J3 League club Iwate Grulla Morioka, on loan from Hokkaido Consadole Sapporo.

Career
Ren Fujimura promoted J1 League club Hokkaido Consadole Sapporo from youth team in 2017. On May 3, he debuted in J.League Cup (v FC Tokyo).

Club statistics
.

References

External links
Profile at Hokkaido Consadole Sapporo

1999 births
Living people
Association football people from Hokkaido
Japanese footballers
J1 League players
J2 League players
J3 League players
Hokkaido Consadole Sapporo players
Montedio Yamagata players
Iwate Grulla Morioka players
Association football forwards